Phebe Bekker (born 27 July 2005) is an English ice dancer who represents Great Britain. With her current skating partner, James Hernandez, she is a two-time ISU Junior Grand Prix silver medalist, a two-time British junior national champion (2021–2022), and finished in the top 10 at the 2022 World Junior Championships.

Bekker/Hernandez are the first British ice dance team to win a medal on the ISU Junior Grand Prix circuit.

Personal life 
Bekker was born on 27 July 2005 in London, England. She is currently a high school student, and homeschools through Wolsey Hall, Oxford.

Career

Early years 
Bekker began learning how to skate at age eight by attending public skate sessions with a friend. She is a two-time (2018, 2019) British solo ice dance champion, and transitioned to partnered ice dance in 2019. She competed domestically with her first partner, Theodore Alexander, for the 2019–20 season before teaming up with her current partner, James Hernandez.

2021–22 season: International junior debut 
Bekker/Hernandez made their international debut as a team on ISU Junior Grand Prix at the 2021 JGP Slovenia in late September. They were tenth in both segments of competition to place tenth overall. At their second assignment, the 2021 JGP Poland, Bekker/Hernandez placed eighth in the rhythm dance and seventh in the free dance to finish finally in eighth place. 

In November, Bekker/Hernandez won their first junior national title at the 2021 British Championships, leading silver medalists Bushell/Lapsky by nearly 30 points. Bekker said of the win, "After such a relatively short time together, we are delighted to win our first British title." Due to their placement at nationals, Bekker/Hernandez were named to the British team for the 2022 World Junior Championships in Tallinn. Before Junior Worlds, Bekker/Hernandez were assigned to the Egna Dance Trophy where they finished seventh. Competing in Tallinn, Bekker/Hernandez were tenth in the rhythm dance and eleventh in the free dance to place tenth overall.

2022–23 season 
Beginning the new season at British Ice Skating's new Britannia Cup event, Bekker/Hernandez won gold. On the Junior Grand Prix, Bekker/Hernandez won the silver medal at the 2022 JGP Czech Republic. They won a second silver medal at the 2022 JGP Poland I, in the process becoming the first British dance team to qualify for a Junior Grand Prix Final. Following the end of the Junior Grand Prix, they won their second British junior national title.

Competing at the Final in Torino, they finished second in the rhythm dance, aided by a double-fall by pre-event favourites Mrázková/Mrázek. Hernandez commented on attending the event, saying it was "a really surreal moment, walking down the steps. We've never walked into an area with ambient lighting before. It felt very special." They were overtaken in the free dance by both Lim/Quan of South Korea and Mrázková/Mrázek, finishing fourth overall.

In the new year, Bekker/Hernandez own the bronze medal at the Bavarian Open, finishing behind Grimm/Savitskiy of Germany and Americans Neset/Markelov. They entered the 2023 World Junior Championships in Calgary as possible podium contenders, and set a new personal best score of 68.89 in the rhythm dance, finishing 0.89 points ahead of Canadian team Bashynska/Beaumont, who had been expected to contend for the title but erred on their pattern segment. Bekker/Hernandez earned a bronze small medal for the segment. In the free dance they set another new personal best, but they finished fourth in the segment and, by 0.06 points, fourth overall behind the Canadians due to a one-point deduction for an extended lift. Bekker said that they had "mixed feelings and emotions" about the outcome.

Programs

With Hernandez

Competitive highlights 
JGP: Junior Grand Prix

With Hernandez

Detailed results 
ISU personal bests highlighted in bold.''

With Hernandez

Junior results

References

External links 
 

2005 births
Living people
British female ice dancers
English female ice dancers
People from Ashtead